This is a list of settlements in Hampshire by population based on the results of the 2011 census. The next United Kingdom census will take place in 2021. In 2011, there were 42 built-up area subdivisions with 5,000 or more inhabitants in Hampshire, shown in the table below.

Population ranking

See also 

 Hampshire

References 

Hampshire
Hampshire-related lists
Hampshire